Texas Flip N Move is a show featured on DIY Network.

Premise
The show features professional home renovators who purchase older houses to flip for profit.

Unlike many renovation shows, the renovators only buy and sell houses (not the underlying land). At the initial auction, the renovators can only view the home from the outside and must also factor in costs of moving the house from the original lot to the renovation site. At the renovation site, the teams renovate the houses and sell them at auction. A typical episode consists of two of the teams each buying a house to renovate, with friendly competition as they each try to make more profit than the other team.  The houses are usually sold with no land and the sale price normally includes the price of transportation to the buyer's property.  Some episodes feature the teams moving houses to empty developments where they've purchased lots to set the houses on before renovation, occasionally putting more than one structure on each lot.  In these cases, the land is sold along with the house(s) at the end of the process and the cost of the lot is added to the final tally of costs when calculating the profit.

Cast
Donna Snow King and Toni Snow Barksdale ("The Snow Sisters") (Season 1-present)
Randy Martin and Bleu Pride ("The Lone Wolf") (Season 1-present)
Myers Jackson (the selling auctioneer) (Season 1-present)
Casey Hester and Catrina Kidd (Seasons 4-present) 
From Season 1 to Season 3, Casey, who is Cody's cousin moves houses for the Young Guns. Beginning in Season 3 he takes a more active role and moves and flips houses with the Young Guns.  From season 4 onward, Casey partners with Catrina who was previously featured as a contractor for the Snow sisters and they continue on as business partners.  Catrina's husband makes occasional appearances to help them out with projects. 
"Gary's Girls" (Season 4-present)
Gary Snow is the brother of Donna and Toni; his four daughters (Donna and Toni's nieces) were featured in a Season 3 episode where they and the Snow Sisters each renovated a shipping container.
Paige and Raf. (Seasons 6-present)
Gary and Jerry (Seasons 7-present)
Cody Biffel (Foreman) 
Cody and Suzi Slay ("The Young Guns") (Seasons 1-3)
H.D. "Daddy" Snow (occasional appearances)
Daddy Snow is the father of Donna, Gary, and Toni, and the grandfather of Gary's four daughters.  In his 80s, he is still active in the house-moving business. He inherited a company created by his father C.A. Snow.

Steven Goode (Construction Foreman)

Series overview

See also
 Louisiana Flip N Move
 Alaska Flip N Move

References

External links
 Official Website
 

2010 American television series debuts
English-language television shows
Home renovation television series
Television shows set in Texas
Television shows set in Fort Worth, Texas
DIY Network original programming